Barnetts Creek is an unincorporated community in Johnson County, Kentucky, United States.

References

Unincorporated communities in Johnson County, Kentucky
Unincorporated communities in Kentucky